Amor mío may refer to:

Amor mío (Argentine TV series)
Amor mío (Mexican TV series)
Amor mío (Venezuelan TV series)